The Superior Court of California, County of Mendocino, also known as the Mendocino County Superior Court or  Mendocino Superior Court, is the branch of the California superior court with jurisdiction over Mendocino County.

History
Mendocino County was one of the original counties established when California gained statehood in 1850.

For revenue and judicial purposes, Mendocino County was attached to Sonoma County and gained its independence in 1859; that year the county seat was established at Ukiah. The only other competitor for the county seat was Calpella. The first county courthouse was built in 1859. This first courthouse was accepted on January 24, 1860.

It was replaced by a new courthouse in 1872, which was described as "a building that should be the pride of every citizen of Mendocino County". The architect was A. P. Petit. The initial plans were accepted by the County Board of Supervisors on January 15, 1872, then summarily rejected and revised plans were accepted on March 23. During construction, county offices were temporarily moved to the upper level of Hoffman's store, at the corner of Perkins and State streets.

The 1873 courthouse in Ukiah was replaced on the same site in 1950 with the current, modern building designed by C.A. Caulkins, Jr. An annex to the 1873 courthouse, built in 1928, was retained.

Venues

A new 7-room courthouse has been proposed for Ukiah to replace the 1950 structure. The new courthouse will be built on a  site off East Perkins Street. The branch courthouse in Fort Bragg sees limited service.

References

External links
 
 

Superior Court
Superior courts in California